Sengoku Ace, fully titled Sengoku Ace: Tengai Episode I and also known as Samurai Aces in the English version, is a vertically scrolling shooter released in the arcades by Psikyo in 1993. The first game by Psikyo, Sengoku Ace was designed by Shin Nakamura, the creator of Aero Fighters (Sonic Wings) and the company's founder.

Gameplay

Plot
The science fantasy story of Sengoku Ace resolves around the six Feudal Japan (Sengoku period) characters sent on a mission to stop an evil cult and rescue the Shogun's kidnapped daughter, princess Tsukihime (Moon Princess), before she can be used as a sacrifice to resurrect their demon god. The game features 21 endings, different for various characters and two-player pairings.

Characters
 Flush (Flash) / Ayin / Aine (閃光のアイン) - A 25-year-old, one-eyed, blonde samurai flying a J7W, who is looking for his sister Asuka. He is voiced by Hisao Egawa.
 Gen / Gennai (からくり屋 源内) - A 77-year-old scientist with a small robot assistant named Ranmaru, who flies a small, agile "Super Fighter" plane that resembles an X-wing starfighter from Star Wars. He is voiced by Daisuke Gōri.
 Jane Hayate (はやてのジェーン) - A 21-year-old blonde and blue-eyed beautiful female ninja who flies a glider. She is voiced by Hiroko Emori.
 Kenno (Kenno Maru) / Kenoumaru / Ohmaru (犬王丸) - A "super genius dog" flying a high-tech YF-23 aircraft (according to some of his team play endings, really a young man sealed in a dog form).
 Miko / Koyori (Koyori Togashi) (富樫こより) - A 17-year-old miko with a fascination for money, who flies a biplane. In Sengoku Ace, Koyori is still very young and tomboyish. She is also voiced by Hiroko Emori.
 Tengai (Tengai Kano) (ターボ坊主 天外) - A 50-year-old Japanese Buddhist wandering monk who flies a bizarre bird-like plane. He is also voiced by Daisuke Gōri.

Reception
In Japan, Game Machine listed Samurai Aces on their June 1, 1993 issue as being the fourth most-successful table arcade unit of the month.

Brazilian magazine Ação Games gave it 9/10.

Legacy
The original and arranged soundtrack for the game (GCD-1) was released by Shinseisha on January 22, 1994. The game's manga adaptation titled Sengoku Ace - Ataru Kadiba (戦国エース - かぢば あたる) was published by Shinseisha in the Gamest Comics series on December 25, 1994.

In December 2004, the game was released for the PlayStation 2 as part of the Psikyo Shooting Collection Vol. 2: Sengoku Ace & Sengoku Blade by Taito and 505 Games. It also was re-released one year later as a budget-range title. In 2018, it was also released for the Nintendo Switch. In 2022, the original arcade version will be included as part of the Sega Astro City Mini V, a vertically-oriented variant of the Sega Astro City mini console.

Sengoku Ace was followed by two sequels, Sengoku Blade: Sengoku Ace Episode II in 1996 and Sengoku Cannon: Sengoku Ace Episode III in 2004. The Sengoku series characters, along with the ones from Psikyo's Gunbird series, later joined up with several Capcom characters (especially from the Street Fighter fame) in the crossover game Taisen Net Gimmick: Capcom & Psikyo All Stars, released for the Dreamcast in 2001.

References

Sources
 Official website (characters page).

External links
 Official website (Nintendo)
 Official website (Psikyo) (Internet Archive)
 Official website (Taito) (Internet Archive)
Hardcore Gaming 101: Sengoku Ace

1993 video games
505 Games games
Android (operating system) games
Arcade video games
Banpresto games
City Connection franchises
Cooperative video games
Multiplayer and single-player video games
Nintendo Switch games
Psikyo games
Science fantasy video games
Sengoku video games
Taito arcade games
Vertically scrolling shooters
Video games about cults
Video games about ninja
Video games about samurai
Video games developed in Japan
Video games featuring female protagonists
Video games set in feudal Japan